Provincial forests are located within the Province of Manitoba, in Canada, as large areas of unpopulated and undeveloped forests. Under the Forests Act, provincial forests were developed primarily as a source of sustainable timber supply for forestry operations. Today there are 15 designated provincial forests in Manitoba, totaling almost 22,000 km2. Provincial forests are managed for diverse economic, environmental, social and cultural uses. They are very popular places for berry picking, mushroom picking, hunting, hiking, skiing, snowmobiling, and exploring.

See also
List of protected areas of Manitoba

References

External links
Manitoba Forestry Branch

Forests of Manitoba

Manitoba
Manitoba geography-related lists